Okyenhene is the title of the Tribal King of Akyem Abuakwa (also styled Okyeman), an old powerful traditional kingdom in the Eastern Region of Ghana. The Okyenhene is also referred to as the Kwaebibiremhene as his traditional territory is an area of a dense forest. Again, the Okyenhene is considered the head of the Asona clan (Asona Piesie). Asona is the largest of the clans of the Akans which includes the Oyoko, Aduana, Agona, Asakyire, Bretuo, Ekuona among others.

The role of Okyenhene is not hereditary, as a new Okeynhene is elected by a council.

On the death of an Okyenhene, it is mandatory for all Asona Chiefs in Ghana to partake in the royal burial dubbed "doteyie" and funeral also called "Odupon ayie". These ceremonies normally lasts seven days each. The Okyenhene's stool is called the Ofori Panin stool. He presides over his territory through his divisional chiefs as well as other chiefs.

The current Okyenhene, Osagyefuo Amoatia Ofori Panin II ascended the Okyeman Ofori Panin stool on October 4, 1999 after the death of his predecessor Osagyefuo Kuntunkununku II. He is the 35th Paramount Chief to ascend the stool.

List of Okyenhenes

References 

Royal titles
Living people
Ghanaian royalty
Year of birth missing (living people)